The Golden Psalter of St. Gall (Psalterium Aureum, Cod. Sang. 22) is a Carolingian Gallican psalter  produced in the late  9th century, probably begun in West Francia (Soissons, court school of Charles the Bald?), later continued in St. Gall Abbey.

The manuscript consists of 344 vellum leaves (37 x 28 cm), with  two full-page miniatures and fifteen full or half-page illustrations on the psalm titles. The decorations are predominantly in the first half of the manuscript; the final pictorial illustration shows "David in the desert of Judah" (depicted as a Carolingian nobleman with three men-at-arms standing in a forest), illustrating psalm 62 (63) (p. 141), although the figure of King David is again shown as standing on the S initial of psalm 68 (69).

References

Scherrer Gustav, Verzeichniss der Handschriften der Stiftsbibliothek von St. Gallen, Halle 1875,  11–12.
Florentine Mütherich, Joachim E. Gaehde: Karolingische Buchmalerei. Prestel, München 1979, 122–126.
Euw, Anton von, Die St. Galler Buchkunst vom 8. bis zum Ende des 11. Jahrhunderts, Band I: Textband, St. Gallen 2008, 400–408, Nr. 98.

External links

E-Codices: Goldener Psalter (Psalterium aureum) von St. Gallen

Carolingian psalters
Manuscripts of the Abbey library of Saint Gall